"Groovin'" is a 1967 song by The Young Rascals and covered by many artists.

Groovin' may also refer to:

"Groovin'" (Ben E. King song), 1964
[[Groovin' (The Young Rascals album)|Groovin''' (The Young Rascals album)]], 1967
[[Groovin' (Idrees Sulieman album)|Groovin' (Idrees Sulieman album)]], 1986
Groovin''' (Toshinobu Kubota album)]], 1987
[[Groovin' (Bill Wyman's Rhythm Kings album)|Groovin (Bill Wyman's Rhythm Kings album)]], 2000
[[Groovin' (Paul Carrack album)|Groovin''' (Paul Carrack album)]], 2001
[[Groovin' (EP)|Groovin (EP), a 1984 EP by The Style CouncilGroovin' with Buddy Tate, a 1961 album by Buddy TateGroovin' with Manfred Mann'', a 1964 EP by Manfred Mann
"Groovin (Out on Life)", a 1969 single by The Newbeats

See also 
 Groove (disambiguation)